Mount Royal station, Mont Royal station, etc., may refer to:

 Mont-Royal station (Montreal Metro), in Montreal, Quebec, Canada
 Ville-de-Mont-Royal station, surface metro station in Mount Royal, Quebec, Canada
 Mount Royal station (Light RailLink), a Baltimore Light Rail station adjacent to the historic Mount Royal Station in Baltimore, Maryland, United States
 Mount Royal Station (Maryland Institute College of Art), a university building and historically a station on the Baltimore and Ohio Railroad in Baltimore, Maryland, United States

See also
 Mount Royal (disambiguation)